Najib Naderi (born 22 February 1984) is an Afghan former footballer who played as a defender and made four appearances for the Afghanistan national team in 2003.

Career statistics

References

Living people
1984 births
Afghan footballers
Association football defenders
Afghanistan international footballers
Hamburger SV players
Altonaer FC von 1893 players
Afghan expatriate footballers
Afghan expatriate sportspeople in Germany
Expatriate footballers in Germany